David Klammert (born 9 April 1994) is a Czech judoka.

He is the bronze medallist of the 2021 Judo Grand Slam Antalya. He competed for the Czech Republic at the 2020 Summer Olympics where he was eliminated in the round of 32 by Li Kochman of Israel.

References

External links
 

1994 births
Czech male judoka
Living people
Judoka at the 2019 European Games
Judoka at the 2020 Summer Olympics
Olympic judoka of the Czech Republic